The George Medal is awarded by the United Kingdom and Commonwealth of Nations for acts of great bravery; over 2,000 medals have been awarded since its inception in September 1940. Below is set out a selection of recipients of the award, between 1960 and 1989. A person's presence in this list does not suggest their award was more notable than any other award of the George Medal.

Where a recipient has received a second George Medal, a picture of the ribbon bearing the bar symbol is shown. In December 1977 the provisions for the medal were altered, allowing it to be awarded posthumously, in which case the "" symbol appears next to the recipient's name.

1960s

1970s

1980s

See also 

 List of recipients of the George Medal for other decades

References

1960s
19th century in the United Kingdom
19th century in the British Empire